Elizabeth Ongoro is a Kenyan politician. She belongs to Orange Democratic Movement and was elected to represent the Kasarani Constituency in the 10th Parliamentof the National Assembly of Kenya from the 2007 Kenyan parliamentary election to the 2013 Kenyan parliamentary election.

References

External links 
Kasarani Constituency

Living people
Year of birth missing (living people)
Orange Democratic Movement politicians
Members of the National Assembly (Kenya)
21st-century Kenyan women politicians
21st-century Kenyan politicians